22–23 The Shambles (also known as 1A and 1½ Whip-Ma-Whop-Ma-Gate) is an historic pair of buildings in the English city of York, North Yorkshire. Grade II listed, parts of the structures date to the early 18th century, with alterations occurring over the next two hundred years.

References 

22
Houses in North Yorkshire
18th-century establishments in England
Grade II listed buildings in York
Grade II listed houses
18th century in York